6700 may refer to:
 6700, the last year in the 67th century (7th millennium)
 Nokia 6700 classic, a mobile phone released in 2009
 Nokia 6700 slide, a smartphone released in 2010